The Preševo Valley is a geopolitical region in southern Serbia, along the border with Kosovo. The valley geographically includes municipalities of Bujanovac and Preševo, and politically also Medveđa. It is home to most of the Albanian community in Serbia, who comprise most of the population with the rest being Serbs and Romani. As of 2022, the area has around 80,000 inhabitants.

Terminology 

In Albanian the area is referred to as Lugina e Preshevës and in Serbian as Preševska dolina. Albanians also sometimes call the region eastern Kosovo as parts of the territory were considered part of geographical region of Kosovo until the end of World War II. Preševo itself was a kaza of the Kosovo Vilayet until 1912. Medvedja was part of the sanjak of Niš until 1878. The change in the administrative border between In a series of administrative reforms after the war, it became part of Pčinja District. Because of Albanian demands for territorial autonomy, the use of "Preševo Valley" is somewhat politically loaded. In Serbian official statements, the area is usually referred to as the "territory of municipalities of Preševo, Bujanovac and Medveđa".

Geography 
Geographically, the Preševo Valley is coterminous with the river basin of Preševska Moravica from its source near the town of Preševo to the confluence with South Morava at Bujanovac. It is part of the Morava/Vardar North–south route across the Balkans, which follows the flows of Great Morava and South Morava through Serbia. This route carries the pan-European corridor X and E75. The importance of this route to Serbia has increased since 1999, when the main alternative route, through Pristina, became unusable due to the Kosovo War and subsequent loss of Serbian control over Kosovo.

History 
In 1938, during the colonisation of Kosovo, Preševo was designated in the Turkish-Yugoslav Convention as one of the areas whose population would be forced to migrate to Turkey.

The Yugoslav communist government, seeking to maintain Serbian control over the road and rail routes that passed through the region and also control Albanian nationalists, separated this region from Kosovo and organized it into Serbia. During the Kosovo War 6,000–8,000 ethnic Albanians left the area. They reported that they were being conscripted, and Serbian paramilitaries were trying to force them into military barracks.

Preševo Valley conflict 

In 2001, as a follow-up to the Kosovo War, there were clashes between Serbian security forces and ethnic Albanian guerrillas linked to the Kosovo Liberation Army (KLA), known as the Liberation Army of Preševo, Medveđa and Bujanovac (Albanian: Ushtria Çlirimtare për Preshevë, Medvegjë dhe Bujanoc, UÇPMB). The aim of UÇPM was to take full control of Preševo, Bujanovac and Medveđa and hold them until such time as the adjacent lands, Kosovo and western Macedonia, also came under Albanian control. This should have been followed by the gradual opening of the borders. Lacking the attention of the international media, the incidents paused as the activities spread south of the border into Macedonia from where the twin organization National Liberation Army, engaged in a war against Macedonian authorities.  The Presevo valley conflict ended after international intervention that led to peace treaty, which demilitarise the area, amnestied UÇPMB and granted to the Yugoslav army entry to the region under NATO's approval.

In September 2007, Boris Tadić, the president of Serbia, stated "that former and current terrorists, who recently managed to escape from prison in Kosovo, were located in northern regions of the Republic of Macedonia". According to Tadić, "terrorists are planning new attacks on municipalities in southern Serbia in order to start a new Preševo Valley conflict".

In 2021 the Helsinki Committee for Human Rights in Serbia reported that the Serbian government was undertaking a "passivation of residence of Albanians" resulting in Albanians living in Southern Serbia losing the right to vote, their property, health insurance, pension and employment. This measure amounted to "ethnic cleansing through administrative means".

Demographics 

In the municipalities of Bujanovac, Preševo and Medveđa, 122,147 citizens were registered, of which 96,359 were Albanians, according to the first data of the newly completed census 2022 in Serbia. Since 2002, when the municipalities in the south where albanians predominantly lived for the last time participated in the census, the population in the municipalities of Bujanovac and Preševo has increased by more than 35,000 people.

After completing the census, the president of the National Council of Albanians, Ragmi Mustafa, wrote on His Facebook page that the census showed that there were about 100,000 Albanians in Serbia and that this was a response to the "discriminatory passivation of albanian sojourn".

The 2002 census recorded 34,904 people in Presevo and 43,302 in Bujanovac (78,206 total; 54,779 Albanians). Most of the Albanian population boycotted the 2011 census. Serbian government estimated that the number of inhabitants in these two municipalities is 67,900 (of which almost 70% are Albanians). Albanians are majority both in Presevo and Bujanovac, while Serbs are the second biggest ethnic group. In 2002, Medveđa had 10,760 citizens (2,816 Albanians). In 2015, after an agreement between the local institutions and the Serbian government, an international team headed by the OSCE compiled a report which assessed the population in Presevo at 29,600, in Bujanovac at 38,300 and in Medveđa at 7,400.

Politics 
There are six parties which represent the Albanian minority in local and national politics. The Party for Democratic Action, one of the bigger organizations, won two seats in the 2014 parliamentary election. Other parties boycotted the elections, citing deep discontent over Belgrade's treatment of the Albanian minority as one of the main reasons. As a result, the National Assembly of Serbia has only two ethnic Albanians.

The region is often mentioned in connection with political negotiations of the Kosovo status process. Albanian leaders from the Preševo Valley wanted to participate in the talks but were not allowed. A territorial exchange between Serbia and Kosovo involving the Preševo Valley (and sometimes Medveđa) and North Kosovo is an often-mentioned topic in media and informal "probe" statements, but all sides in the official process so far rejected any prospect of a border change. A Chinese scholar proposed another territory exchange: the Serb enclaves south of the Ibar River with Preševo Valley.

See also 
 Albanians in Serbia

References 

Albanian communities in Serbia
Preshevo Valley